The Men's 110 metres hurdles at the 2011 World Championships in Athletics was held at the Daegu Stadium on August 28 and 29.

The final featured the three fastest 110 hurdlers in history.  World Record Holder Dayron Robles took an early lead but was being passed by former record holder Liu Xiang.  Between the last two hurdles, Robles' right arm backswing caught Liu's oncoming left arm.  Liu hit the tenth hurdle, with a second arm collision with Robles, slowing Liu enough to finish in third.  Robles crossed the finish line first, but after the race, the Chinese team protested and Robles was disqualified, giving the championship to second finisher Jason Richardson.
Andy Turner was separated from David Oliver in a photo finish for the bronze medal, both receiving the same time.  5th place in the race was also so close the photo could not separate the two competitors.

Medalists

Records

Qualification standards

Schedule

Results

Heats
Qualification: First 3 in each heat (Q) and the next 4 fastest (q) advance to the semifinals.

Wind:Heat 1: +1.0 m/s, Heat 2: −0.2 m/s, Heat 3: +1.4 m/s, Heat 4: −0.3 m/s

Semifinals
Qualification: First 3 in each heat (Q) and the next 2 fastest (q) advance to the final.

Wind:Heat 1: −1.4 m/s, Heat 2: −1.6 m/s

Final
Wind: −1.1 m/s

References

External links

Hurdles 110
Sprint hurdles at the World Athletics Championships